Mount Air is a historic home located at Faulkner, Charles County, Maryland, United States. It was built in 1801, and is basically a regionally typical Federal style house with a three-story central block with complementary wings. The home has the only known boxwood garden in lower Southern Maryland of its dimensions and age to retain its original formal plan.

Mount Air was listed on the National Register of Historic Places in 1978.

References

External links
, including photo from 1970, at Maryland Historical Trust

Houses in Charles County, Maryland
Houses on the National Register of Historic Places in Maryland
Federal architecture in Maryland
Houses completed in 1801
National Register of Historic Places in Charles County, Maryland